Open question may refer to:

 Open-ended question, a question that cannot be answered with a "yes" or "no" response
 Open problem, or open question, a known problem which can be accurately stated, and which is assumed to have an objective and verifiable solution, but which has not yet been solved
 Open-question argument, a philosophical argument put forward by British philosopher G. E. Moore

See also 
 Naturalistic fallacy